Cork North-Central is a parliamentary constituency represented in Dáil Éireann, the lower house of the Irish parliament or Oireachtas. The constituency elects 4 deputies (Teachtaí Dála, commonly known as TDs) on the system of proportional representation by means of the single transferable vote (PR-STV).

History and boundaries
The constituency was created under the Electoral (Amendment) Act 1980 and first used at the 1981 general election, taking in parts of the former Cork City and Cork Mid constituencies. It is a mixed urban-rural constituency made up of the  Cork North Central, Cork North East and Cork North West local electoral areas of Cork City north of the River Lee, and much of the Blarney local electoral area of County Cork.

TDs

Elections

2020 general election

2019 by-election
A by-election was held in the constituency on 29 November 2019, to fill the seat vacated by Billy Kelleher on his election to the European Parliament in May 2019.

2016 general election

2011 general election

2007 general election

2002 general election

1997 general election

1994 by-election
Following the death of Labour Party TD Gerry O'Sullivan, a by-election was held on 10 November 1994. The seat was won by the Democratic Left candidate Kathleen Lynch.

1992 general election

1989 general election

1987 general election

November 1982 general election

February 1982 general election

1981 general election

See also
Elections in the Republic of Ireland
Politics of the Republic of Ireland
List of Dáil by-elections
List of political parties in the Republic of Ireland

References

External links
Oireachtas Constituency Dashboards
Oireachtas Members Database

Dáil constituencies
Politics of County Cork
Politics of Cork (city)
1981 establishments in Ireland
Constituencies established in 1981